Yoko Yoneda (born 22 November 1975) is a Japanese synchronized swimmer who competed in the 2000 Summer Olympics and in the 2004 Summer Olympics.

References

1975 births
Living people
Japanese synchronized swimmers
Olympic synchronized swimmers of Japan
Synchronized swimmers at the 2000 Summer Olympics
Synchronized swimmers at the 2004 Summer Olympics
Olympic silver medalists for Japan
Olympic medalists in synchronized swimming
Medalists at the 2004 Summer Olympics
Medalists at the 2000 Summer Olympics
21st-century Japanese women